Ryan O'Neill (born 19 January 1990) is a retired footballer from Northern Ireland.

He began his career in the youth team at West Ham United and has represented Northern Ireland at under-21 level, and is a cousin of former Barnet teammate Mark Hughes. He signed for Barnet in August 2009 and made his debut in a 1–0 away defeat to Lincoln City on 8 August 2009. O'Neill was released at the end of the season.

Ryan signed for Northern Irish Premiership and home town side Dungannon Swifts in September 2010, making his debut against Donegal Celtic.

In July 2013, O'Neill signed a 2-year contract with Irish Cup winners Glentoran. He left the club at the end of the season to move to the United States.

References

External links

1990 births
Living people
People from Dungannon
Association football defenders
West Ham United F.C. players
Barnet F.C. players
Dungannon Swifts F.C. players
Glentoran F.C. players
Northern Ireland under-21 international footballers
Association footballers from Northern Ireland
English Football League players
NIFL Premiership players